Parajapyx unidentatus is a species of two-pronged bristletail in the family Parajapygidae. It is found in North America.

References

Diplura
Articles created by Qbugbot
Animals described in 1941